Storr's monitor (Varanus ocreatus) is a medium-sized species of monitor lizard in the family Varanidae. The species is native to Western Australia and the Northern Territory in Australia. It belongs to the subgenus Odatria.

References

Varanus
Reptiles described in 1980
Reptiles of Western Australia
Reptiles of the Northern Territory
Monitor lizards of Australia
Taxa named by Glen Milton Storr